Total liberation, also referred to as total liberation ecology or veganarchism, is a political philosophy and movement that combines anarchism with a commitment to animal and earth liberation. Whilst more traditional approaches to anarchism have often focused primarily on opposing the state and capitalism, total liberation is additionally concerned with opposing all additional forms of human oppression as well as the oppression of other animals and ecosystems. Proponents of total liberation typically espouse a holistic and intersectional approach aimed at using direct action to dismantle all forms of domination and hierarchy, common examples of which include the state, capitalism, patriarchy, racism, heterosexism, cissexism, disablism, ageism, speciesism and ecological domination.

History and key concerns 
Following a period of general inactivity after the Second World War, anarchism reemerged as a force in global politics during the 1960s. This new era of anarchist struggle was distinguished by its adoption of a range of concerns such as feminism, anticolonialism, queer liberation, antispeciesism and ecology that were previously of little or no concern for most anarchists. More specifically, the involvement by anarchists in the animal and earth liberation movements was in part characterized by the rising popularity of veganism within radical circles, something that has been grounded in concerns for both animal rights and environmentalism as well as the formation of direct action groups such as the Hunt Saboteurs Association, Earth First!, the Animal Liberation Front and the Earth Liberation Front.

The concept of total liberation began to be used by anarchists during the 1990s in an explicit attempt to clarify important connections between all forms of oppression and to situate the often isolated political movements against them within a single overall struggle. Moreover, a commitment to total liberation, beyond its emergence from the historical development of the anarchist movement, is also typically grounded in a concern for contemporary schools of political thought such as intersectionality, antispeciesism, ecofeminism, deep ecology and social ecology. As David Pellow summarises:
The concept of total liberation stems from a determination to understand and combat all forms of inequality and oppression. I propose that it comprises four pillars: (1) an ethic of justice and anti-oppression inclusive of humans, nonhuman animals, and ecosystems; (2) anarchism; (3) anti-capitalism; and (4) an embrace of direct action tactics.

In his 2014 book The Politics of Total Liberation: Revolution for the 21st Century, American philosopher Steven Best argues for the necessity for disparate social movements to embrace the concept:
The global capitalist world system is inherently destructive to people, animals and nature. It is unsustainable and the bills for three centuries of industrialization are overdue. It cannot be humanized, civilized or made green-friendly, but rather must be transcended through revolution at all levels–social, economic, political, legal, cultural, technological, moral, and conceptual. We must replace single-issue approaches and fragmentary struggles with systemic battles and political alliances. In the most encompassing terms, these clashes address the war against humans, animals and the earth, and must combine in a politics of total liberation. We must link the liberation of humans to other animals to the planet as a whole. We need to build a revolutionary movement strong enough to vanquish capitalist hegemony and to remake society without crushing lodestones of anthropocentrism, speciesism, patriarchy, racism, classism, statism, heterosexism, ableism, and every other pernicious form of hierarchal domination.

In 2022, Green Theory & Praxis Journal published a Total Liberation Pathway which involved "an abolition of compulsory work for all beings." Described as a source code to be adapted based on local and changing conditions, the proposal involved reducing humans' workweek to 10 hours and transforming it into voluntary and self-managed hobbies, while freeing animals, ecosystems, plants, minerals, and the planet Earth from exploitation. Referring to climate models, the proposal suggested that it would be possible to provide a comfortable life for all human beings while rewilding at least 75% of the Earth and achieving the ambitious 300 parts per million and 1 degree Celsius climate targets of 2010's People’s Agreement of Cochabamba.

See also 
 Anarchism and animal rights
 Green anarchism

References

Further reading 

Anarchism
Anti-capitalism
Green anarchism
Direct action
Political movements
Radical environmentalism